Japan competed at the 2022 Winter Paralympics in Beijing, China which took place between 4–13 March 2022. In total, 29 athletes were scheduled to compete.

Team captain and para-alpine skier, Momoka Muraoka, became the most successful athlete after winning four medals at once. She won the downhill, Super-G, and giant slalom events. She also won silver in the super combined event.

Medalists

The following Japanese competitors won medals at the games. In the discipline sections below, the medalists' names are bolded.

| width="56%" align="left" valign="top" |

| width="22%" align="left" valign="top" |

Administration

President of the Japanese Paralympic Committee Junichi Kawai served as Chef de Mission.

Competitors
The following is the list of number of competitors participating at the Games per sport/discipline.

Alpine skiing

Japan competed in alpine skiing.

Biathlon

Japan competed in biathlon.

Men

Women

Cross-country skiing

Japan competed in cross-country skiing.

Women

Relay

Snowboarding

Japan competed in snowboarding.

Banked slalom

Snowboard cross

Qualification legend: Q - Qualify to next round; FA - Qualify to medal final; FB - Qualify to consolation final

See also
Japan at the Paralympics
Japan at the 2022 Winter Olympics

References

Nations at the 2022 Winter Paralympics
2022
Winter Paralympics